Matthew Kenneth Tifft (born June 26, 1996) is an American former professional stock car racing driver, and current team owner. He last competed in the Monster Energy NASCAR Cup Series, driving the No. 36 Ford Mustang for Front Row Motorsports until health issues cut his 2019 season short. In 2020, with his racing career in question due to a past brain tumor and a diagnosis of epilepsy, he became part owner of Live Fast Motorsports with B. J. McLeod & Joe Falk, becoming the youngest current team owner in NASCAR. Tifft also was named to the 2022 Forbes 30 under 30 Class.

Racing career

Early career (2007–2010)
In the fall of 2007, Tifft had his first opportunity to race in a go-kart at Barberton Speedway in Norton, Ohio. He was coached by Kevin Harter of CRP Racing. In 2009, he made his first divisional and national level go kart schedule, under Beasley Motorsports, being coached by Gary Lawson. During this season, Tifft would win two national-level victories. In 2010, Tifft transitioned from karts to asphalt and dirt super late models, with the help of Josh Richards, Dale McDowell, Clint Smith, Benny Gordon, and Tim Schendel.

Stock car racing (2011–present)
2011 marked Tifft's first full year in stock cars, as he compiled two super late model victories and had multiple top-5 finishes. Along with the work with Schendel and Gordon, Tifft also raced a significant number of races with BJ McLeod Motorsports. In 2012, Tifft won the Rookie of the Year title in the ARCA Midwest Tour. In addition, Tifft finished the season with 5th in points overall.

In 2013, Tifft joined the Win-Tron Racing team to race in the NASCAR K&N Pro Series East, as well as select ARCA Series races.

In 2014, Tifft signed with Ken Schrader Racing to run select ARCA and K&N East races. Tifft also made his NASCAR Camping World Truck Series debut at Martinsville Speedway, finishing 8th.

On November 14, 2014, it was announced that Tifft would be running a 6-race schedule with Kyle Busch Motorsports for the 2015 NASCAR Camping World Truck Series.

Tifft made his Xfinity Series debut in 2015 with Joe Gibbs Racing, finishing 10th. The following year, Tifft was then signed by JGR to drive the No. 18 in 13 races. Tifft drove 3 races with JGL Racing driving the No. 24 in the Xfinity Series, before driving for JGR. Tifft also joined Red Horse Racing to drive the No. 11 in the Truck Series.

Tifft sustained a disc condition in his back in 2016, and on recommendation of his doctor, sat out the American Ethanol E15 250. Sam Hornish Jr. subbed for him and ended up winning the race. Tifft eventually underwent surgery for a low-grade glioma in his brain. On September 12, NASCAR officials cleared Tifft to return to racing.

On November 4, 2016, it was announced that Tifft would drive full-time in JGR's No. 19 entry in 2017, competing for the Rookie of the Year.

Tifft had not scored a top five in 2017, but at Mid-Ohio Sports Car Course on August 12, 2017, he finished a career best third place.
On August 27, 2017, Tifft came within two laps of his first Xfinity Series victory at the season's annual trip to Road America. Tifft was leading on the penultimate lap when a fast-closing Jeremy Clements hooked Tifft in Turn 14, spinning both cars out within sight of the finish line. Tifft would ultimately finish 3rd behind Clements and Michael Annett, tying his Mid-Ohio finish.

On October 5, 2017, it was announced that Tifft had signed a multi-year deal to drive the No. 2 Chevrolet Camaro for Richard Childress Racing starting in 2018.

On November 27, 2018, it was announced that Tifft would drive the Front Row Motorsports No. 36 Ford Mustang GT in the Monster Energy NASCAR Cup Series and compete for 2019 Rookie of the Year honors. Tifft selected 36 as his racing number to honor his mentor Ken Schrader, who raced with that number in the Winston Cup Series from 2000 to 2002. Prior to the Martinsville race, Tifft was rushed to the hospital after suffering a seizure and blacking out in the team hauler, forcing Matt Crafton to take over the No. 36 for the race. As a result of the seizure, he missed the rest of the 2019 season as John Hunter Nemechek substituted in the No. 36 for the final three races. On November 13, 2019, he and FRM parted ways as Tifft intended to focus on his health and could not commit to a full-time 2020 schedule.

On October 23, 2020, Tifft and B. J. McLeod purchased Archie St. Hilare's half of Go Fas Racing's charter. Tifft, McLeod, and Joe Falk will use the charter full-time in 2021 while Go Fas Racing will scale down to a part-time schedule. When the team was formed as Live Fast Motorsports, Tifft would later say in an interview that part of the reason he decided to move to team ownership was because of the uncertainty over continuing his racing career due to his health issues, and his desire to continue his involvement in the sport. He also confirmed in the interview that doctors advised him to retire after 2019, because of his health issues. Tifft was the youngest Cup Series team owner in 2021 at age 24. Because of this achievement, he was named to the Forbes 30 Under 30 for 2022.

Personal life
Tifft was born in Fairfax County, Virginia, and grew up with brother Morgan and sister Maggie in Hinckley, Ohio. He graduated from Highland High School in nearby Granger, Ohio. He currently attends school at UNC Charlotte, majoring in Business Management. He is a fan of the Cleveland Guardians, Cleveland Browns, and Cleveland Cavaliers. Tifft has attended several Indians games and threw the first pitch at an Indians game in 2018. Tifft also ran an Indians Fanatics car at his home track at Mid-Ohio.

On July 1, 2016, Tifft underwent surgery to remove a low-grade benign brain tumor. The tumor was discovered during treatment of a back injury.

Tifft became engaged in the offseason following the 2018 season.

Motorsports career results

NASCAR
(key) (Bold – Pole position awarded by qualifying time. Italics – Pole position earned by points standings or practice time. * – Most laps led.)

Monster Energy Cup Series

Daytona 500

Xfinity Series

Camping World Truck Series

K&N Pro Series East

K&N Pro Series West

 Season still in progress
 Ineligible for series points

ARCA Racing Series
(key) (Bold – Pole position awarded by qualifying time. Italics – Pole position earned by points standings or practice time. * – Most laps led.)

References

External links

 
 

1996 births
Living people
Sportspeople from Fairfax, Virginia
Racing drivers from Virginia
University of North Carolina at Charlotte alumni
NASCAR drivers
ARCA Menards Series drivers
Sportspeople from the Washington metropolitan area
Kyle Busch Motorsports drivers
Joe Gibbs Racing drivers
Richard Childress Racing drivers
ARCA Midwest Tour drivers
KCMG drivers